The 1902–03 Ottawa Hockey Club season was the club's 18th season of play. The club would win the CAHL championship in a playoff with the Montreal Victorias to win the Club's first Stanley Cup. For their win, the players would each be given a silver nugget. From that day forward, the club was nicknamed the Silver Seven.

Off-season 
Defenceman and former captain Peg Duval left the team to sign with the Pittsburgh Victorias as a professional in the Western Pennsylvania Hockey League.

Regular season

Highlights 

This season was the first season for Frank McGee and Art Moore. McGee would place second in the league scoring race with 14 goals in six games.

The season would be a two team race between Montreal Victorias and Ottawa, splitting their matches between each other. The season ended in a tie, which necessitated a two-game playoff, won by Ottawa to win their first Stanley Cup.

Final standing

Schedule and results

Goaltending averages

Scoring Leaders

Playoffs 

Ottawa and Victorias played a two-game total-goals series.

Game one

Game two

Stanley Cup challenges

Rat Portage vs. Ottawa 

Ottawa defeated the Rat Portage Thistles 6–2, 4–2 (10–4) in a two-game, total goals series in Ottawa, March 12–14, 1903.

As the new CAHL and Cup champions, the Ottawas accepted a challenge from the Rat Portage Thistles of the Manitoba & Northwestern Hockey Association (MNWHA). Entering the best-of-three challenge series, the Thistles were younger and quicker than Ottawa; only one player on the Thistles was over the age of 20. Any chance that those factors could have helped the team was negated by soft ice conditions. Ottawa swept the series with scores of 6–2 and 4–2.

Game one

For their win, the Ottawa players would each receive a silver nugget. From that point on the team would also be known as the Silver Seven.

Ottawa Hockey Club March 1903 Stanley Cup champions

See also 
 1903 CAHL season
 List of Stanley Cup champions

References 
 
 

Ottawa Senators (original) seasons
Stanley Cup championship seasons
Ottawa
Ottawa Hockey
Ottawa Hockey